The Golden Valley Formation is a stratigraphic unit of Late Paleocene to Early Eocene age in the Williston Basin of North Dakota. It is present in western North Dakota and was named for the city of Golden Valley by W.E. Benson and W.M. Laird in 1947. It preserves significant assemblages of fossil plants and vertebrates, as well as mollusk and insect fossils.

Stratigraphy 
The Golden Valley Formation is present as a series of outliers in western North Dakota. It is underlain by the Sentinel Butte Formation and unconformably overlain by the White River Group.

Lithologies 
The base of the Bear Den Member consists of kaolinitic claystone, mudstone and sandstone that weather to white, light grey, orange, and purple. These are overlain by grey or brownish carbonaceous sediments and, in some areas, a bed of lignite (the Alamo Bluff lignite). In places the sequence is capped by a siliceous bed (the Taylor bed) that represents a weathering surface or paleosol.

The Camels Butte Member consists of montmorillonitic and micaceous claystone, siltstone, lignite, poorly cemented sandstone and conglomerate. The upper part includes a massive fluvial sandstone that caps many of the major buttes in southwestern North Dakota.

Depositional environment 

The Golden Valley Formation was deposited in a broad swampy lowland crossed by fluvial channels. Deposition occurred during late Paleocene (Clarkforkian) to early Eocene (Wasatchian) time, a period that spans the Paleocene-Eocene Thermal Maximum.

Paleontology 
Plant fossils collected from throughout the formation include floating and rooted aquatic plants such as Salvinia, Nelumbo and Isoetes, and lowland forest plants such as the ferns Onoclea and Osmunda, the conifers Glyptostrobus and Metasequoia, and the dicots Platanus and Cercidiphyllum.

The vertebrate fossils have come primarily from the upper, early Eocene Camels Butte Member. They include the remains of mammals such as Coryphodon, Hyracotherium, Homogalax, Sinopa, Didymictis, Hyopsodus, Paramys and others; there are also remains of fish, amphibians, and reptiles such as Trionyx, Peltosaurus, and four genera of crocodilians.

Invertebrate fossils include shells of freshwater mollusks such as Viviparus, Unio, Hydrobia, and Planorbis, and the wing casing of a crabid beetle.

References

Bibliography 

  

Geologic formations of North Dakota
Eocene Series of North America
Paleogene geology of North Dakota
Ypresian Stage
Thanetian Stage
Wasatchian
Clarkforkian
Mudstone formations
Siltstone formations
Sandstone formations of the United States
Coal formations
Conglomerate formations
Fluvial deposits
Fossiliferous stratigraphic units of North America
Paleontology in North Dakota